Daniel or Danny O'Shea may refer to:

Danny O'Shea (ice hockey) (born 1945), retired Canadian ice hockey centre
Danny O'Shea (footballer) (born 1963), English former footballer
Daniel O'Shea (figure skater) (born 1991), American figure skater

See also
O'Shea (surname)